François Errard (born 10 September 1967) is a French former professional tennis player.

A right-handed player, Errard was only 15 when he made his French Open main draw debut in 1983.

Errard reached a career high singles ranking of 531 in the world. He played in the occasional Grand Prix main draw as a doubles player and made two semi-finals.

References

External links
 
 

1967 births
Living people
French male tennis players
People from Charleville-Mézières
Sportspeople from Ardennes (department)